This is a list of golfers who graduated from the Web.com Tour Finals in 2016. The top 25 players on the Web.com Tour's regular season money list in 2016 earned PGA Tour cards for 2017. The Finals determined the other 25 players to earn their PGA Tour cards and their priority order. Due to the cancellation of the Web.com Tour Championship because of Hurricane Matthew, the Finals consisted of only three events.

As in previous seasons, the Finals featured the top 75 players on the Web.com Tour regular season money list, players ranked 126–200 on the PGA Tour's FedEx Cup regular season points list (except players exempt through other means), non-members of the PGA Tour with enough FedExCup regular season points to place 126–200, and special medical exemptions.

To determine the initial 2017 PGA Tour priority rank, the top 25 Web.com Tour regular season players were alternated with the top 25 Web.com Tour Finals players.  This priority order was then reshuffled several times during the 2017 season.

Wesley Bryan and Grayson Murray were fully exempt for the 2016–17 PGA Tour season after leading the full-season and Finals money lists, respectively.

2016 Web.com Tour

*PGA Tour rookie in 2017
†First-time PGA Tour member in 2017, but ineligible for rookie status due to having played eight or more Tour events in a previous season
#Received a three-win promotion to the PGA Tour during 2016 season
 Earned spot in Finals through PGA Tour.
 Earned spot in Finals through FedEx Cup points earned as a PGA Tour non-member.
 Indicates whether the player earned his card through the regular season or through the Finals.

Results on 2016–17 PGA Tour

*PGA Tour rookie in 2017
†First-time PGA Tour member in 2017, but ineligible for rookie status due to having played eight or more Tour events in a previous season
 Retained his PGA Tour card for 2018: won or finished in the top 125 of the FedEx Cup points list.
 Retained PGA Tour conditional status and qualified for the Web.com Tour Finals: finished between 126–150 on FedEx Cup list and qualified for Web.com Tour Finals.
 Failed to retain his PGA Tour card for 2018 but qualified for the Web.com Tour Finals: finished between 150–200 on FedEx Cup list.
 Failed to retain his PGA Tour card for 2018 and to qualify for the Web.com Tour Finals: finished outside the top 200 on FedEx Cup list.

Nicholas Lindheim, Séamus Power, Jonathan Randolph, Ryan Armour, and Joel Dahmen regained their cards through the 2017 Web.com Tour Finals.

Winners on the PGA Tour in 2017

Runners-up on the PGA Tour in 2017

References

External links
Web.com Tour official site

Korn Ferry Tour
PGA Tour
Web.com Tour Finals graduates
Web.com Tour Finals graduates